Watson Macedo (July 21, 1919 – April 8, 1981) was a Brazilian screenwriter, film editor, producer and director.

Selected filmography

Editor
 Minas Conspiracy (1948)

Director
 There Is No Point in Crying (1945)
 Carnival in the Fire (1946)
 Warning to Sailors (1951)
 Samba in Brasília (1960)

References

Bibliography 
 Hernandez-Rodriguez, R. Splendors of Latin Cinema. ABC-CLIO, 2009.

External links 
 

1919 births
1981 deaths
Brazilian film directors
Brazilian film producers
Brazilian screenwriters
Brazilian male film actors
Male actors from Rio de Janeiro (city)
20th-century screenwriters